Rüdiger Naumann (born 11 December 1960) is a retired German football midfielder.

References

1960 births
Living people
German footballers
1. FC Magdeburg players
DDR-Oberliga players
Association football midfielders